Jovsa is a village and municipality in Michalovce District in the Kosice Region of eastern Slovakia.

History
In historical records the village was first mentioned in 1418.

Geography
The village lies at an altitude of 138 metres and covers an area of  (2020-06-30/-07-01).

Population 
It has a population of 830 people (2020-12-31).

Ethnicity
The population is about 99% Slovak in ethnicity.

Culture
The village has a small public library, a post office, a football pitch and a food store.

Genealogical resources

The records for genealogical research are available at the state archive "Statny Archiv in Presov, Slovakia":
 Greek Catholic church records (births/marriages/deaths): 1767-1914 (parish A)

Gallery

See also
 List of municipalities and towns in Slovakia

Population

References

External links

https://web.archive.org/web/20071027094149/http://www.statistics.sk/mosmis/eng/run.html
Surnames of living people in Jovsa

Villages and municipalities in Michalovce District